Granotoma tumida is a species of sea snail, a marine gastropod mollusk in the family Mangeliidae.

Distribution
This marine species occurs off Greenland.

References

 Posselt H.G., Jensen A.S.. 1898. Grønlands Brachiopoder og Bloddyr. Udgivet efter Forfatterens Død ved Ad. S. Jensen. Meddelelser om Grønland, 23: 1–298

External links
  Tucker, J.K. 2004 Catalog of recent and fossil turrids (Mollusca: Gastropoda). Zootaxa 682:1–1295.
 Merkuljev A.V. (2017). Taxonomic puzzle of Propebela arctica (A. Adams, 1855) (Gastropoda, Mangeliidae) - six different species under single name. Ruthenica. 27(1): 15–30

tumida
Gastropods described in 1876